Sulejów  is a village in the administrative district of Gmina Jadów, within Wołomin County, Masovian Voivodeship, in east-central Poland.

The village has a population of 480.

References

Villages in Wołomin County